Hybodus (from  , 'crooked' and   'tooth') is an extinct genus of hybodont, a group of shark-like elasmobranchs that lived from the Late Devonian to the end of the Cretaceous. Species closely related to the type species Hybodus reticulatus lived during the Early Jurassic epoch. Numerous species have been assigned to Hybodus spanning a large period of time, and it is currently considered a wastebasket taxon that is 'broadly polyphyletic' and requires reexamination. The first fossilized teeth from Hybodus were found in England around 1845; since then teeth (and dorsal spines) have been recovered from Europe. During the Triassic, Jurassic, and Cretaceous periods, the hybodonts were especially successful and could be found in shallow seas around the world. For reasons that are not fully understood, the hybodonts became extinct near the end of the Late Cretaceous period.

Description
It possessed a streamlined body shape similar to modern sharks, with two similarly sized dorsal fins that would have helped it steer with precision. As in other Hybodontiformes, dentinous fin spines were present on the dorsal fins of Hybodus. The fin spines of Hybodus exhibit a rib-like ornamentation located towards the tip of the spine, with rows of hooked denticles present on the posterior side. The spines may have played a role in defending the animal from predators.

Hybodus''' varied dentition would have allowed it to opportunistically exploit a variety of food sources; sharper teeth would have been used to catch slippery prey, while the flatter teeth probably helped them crush shelled creatures.  The males also possessed claspers, specialized organs that directly insert sperm into the female, and which are still present in modern sharks.

Species

Several Hybodus species, including H. butleri, H. rajkovichi, and H. montanensis, were later reassigned to Meristodonoides. H. basanus and H. fraasi are now included in the genus Egertonodus, though the placement of the latter in the Egertonodus is considered tentative, due to the strong differences in tooth morphology between the two species. H. obtusus represents a junior synonym of Asteracanthus ornatissimus. A new species from Spain, H. bugarensis, is described in 2013. Two new species from China, H. xinzhuangensis and H. chuanjieensis are named in 2018, and H. houtienensis is considered, while other species from China and Thailand are no longer part of the genus and requires reassessment. However, the only two species that should be retained within the genus Hybodus are the type species H. reticulatus and the other species H. hauffianus''. The problem is that even those two species require reassessment.

References

Sources

Hybodontiformes
Prehistoric shark genera
Permian sharks
Triassic sharks
Jurassic sharks
Cretaceous sharks
Prehistoric fish of Africa
Cretaceous fish of Asia
Fossils of Uzbekistan
Bissekty Formation
Prehistoric fish of Europe
Hasle Formation
Prehistoric fish of South America
Taxa named by Louis Agassiz